La Indomable (English title: The indomitable) is a Mexican telenovela produced by Julissa for Televisa in 1987. The story portrays a female version of the play "The Taming of the Shrew" by English playwright William Shakespeare.

Leticia Calderón and Arturo Peniche starred as the protagonists, while Elvira Monsell starred as the antagonist.

Plot 
María Fernanda Villalpando is a beautiful, rich, but arrogant, proud woman who lives on a large family hacienda known as Villa Paraíso, in the company of her father Gonzalo and her friend Cristina. María Fernanda is engaged to Gerardo, a wealthy businessman. She finds out that he is cheating on her, so she breaks off her engagement. Miguel Echánove, a young and humble engineer who is visiting with the Villalpando's falls in love with Maria Fernanda's beauty. Though hurt by Gerardo's betrayal, she does not correspond to Miguel's feelings for her but decides to use him by marrying him to get revenge on Gerardo.

Miguel finds out he was deceived by María Fernanda and becomes enraged. He moves her to his small town and makes her life miserable. Sofía, an unscrupulous woman who has always been in love with Miguel, takes advantage of this situation and seeks to retain his love at all costs. But while María Fernanda schemed against Miguel, she comes to the realization that she has truly fallen in with him. Admitting to her mistakes, she tries to show Miguel sincere repentance and admits her true feelings for him. The road is not easy as Gerardo and Sofía will try to recover their respective ex-partners at any cost.

Cast 
Leticia Calderón as María Fernanda Villalpando
Arturo Peniche as Miguel Echánove
Elvira Monsell as Sofia Galindo
Alfredo Leal as Gonzalo Villalpando
María Rivas as Doña Adela Echánove
Juan Carlos Serrán as Gerardo San Lucas
Claudia Ramírez as Nabile
Alonso Echánove as Pedro
Carmen Delgado as Cristina
Manuel Gurría as Tomás
Jacaranda Alfaro as Jacaranda del Valle
Miguel Suárez as Salcedo
Queta Carrasco as Pancha
José Luis Cordero as Ruben
Mario Rezares as José
Ayerim de la Pena as Alina Echánove (child)
Cristian Ramírez as Grillo
Federico Elizondo
Rocío Sobrado
Mapat L. de Zatarain, Production Manager
Sergio Jurado
Luis de León

Awards

References

External links 

Mexican telenovelas
1987 telenovelas
Televisa telenovelas
1987 Mexican television series debuts
1987 Mexican television series endings
Spanish-language telenovelas
Television shows set in Mexico